Vosoritide, sold under the brand name Voxzogo, is a medication used for the treatment of achondroplasia.

The most common side effects include injection site reactions (such as swelling, redness, itching, or pain), vomiting, and decreased blood pressure.

Achondroplasia is a genetic condition that causes severely short stature and disproportionate growth. The average height of an adult with achondroplasia is approximately four feet. People with achondroplasia have a genetic mutation that causes a certain growth regulation gene called fibroblast growth factor receptor 3 to be overly active, which prevents normal bone growth. Vosoritide works by binding to a specific receptor called natriuretic peptide receptor-B that reduces the growth regulation gene's activity and stimulates bone growth.

Vosoritide was approved for medical use in the European Union in August 2021, and in the United States in November 2021. The US Food and Drug Administration considers it to be a first-in-class medication.

Medical uses 
In the European Union, vosoritide is indicated for the treatment of achondroplasia in people two years of age and older whose epiphyses are not closed.

In the United States, vosoritide is indicated to increase growth in children five years of age and older with achondroplasia and open epiphyses (growth plates).

Mechanism of action

Vosoritide works by binding to a receptor (target) called natriuretic peptide receptor type B (NPR-B), which reduces the activity of fibroblast growth factor receptor 3 (FGFR3). FGFR3 is a receptor that normally down-regulates cartilage and bone growth when activated by one of the proteins known as acidic and basic fibroblast growth factor. It does so by inhibiting the development (cell proliferation and differentiation) of chondrocytes, the cells that produce and maintain the cartilaginous matrix which is also necessary for bone growth. Children with achondroplasia have one of several possible FGFR3 mutations resulting in constitutive (permanent) activity of this receptor, resulting in overall reduced chondrocyte activity and thus bone growth.

The protein C-type natriuretic peptide (CNP), naturally found in humans, reduces the effects of over-active FGFR3. Vosoritide is a CNP analogue with the same effect but prolonged half-life, allowing for once-daily administration.

Chemistry
Vosoritide is an analog of CNP. It is a peptide consisting of the amino acids proline and glycine plus the 37 C-terminal amino acids from natural human CNP. The complete peptide sequence is
PGQEHPNARK YKGANKKGLS KGCFGLKLDR IGSMSGLGC
with a disulfide bridge between positions 23 and 39 (underlined). The drug must be administered by injection as it would be rendered ineffective by the digestive system if taken by mouth.

History 
Vosoritide was developed by BioMarin Pharmaceutical and got orphan drug status in the US as well as the European Union.

The safety and efficacy of vosoritide in improving growth were evaluated in a year-long, double-blind, placebo-controlled, phase III study in participants five years and older with achondroplasia who have open epiphyses. In the study, 121 participants were randomly assigned to receive either vosoritide injections under the skin or a placebo. Researchers measured the participants' annualized growth velocity, or rate of height growth, at the end of the year. Participants who received vosoritide grew an average 1.57 centimeters taller compared to those who received a placebo. The US Food and Drug Administration (FDA) granted the approval of Voxzogo to BioMarin.

Society and culture

Controversy 
Some people with achondroplasia, as well as parents of children with this condition, have reacted to vosoritide's study results by saying that dwarfism is not a disease and consequently does not need treatment.

Research
Vosoritide has resulted in increased growth in a clinical trial with 26 children. The body proportions, more specifically the ratio of leg length to upper body length – which is lower in achondroplasia patients than in the average population – was not improved by vosoritide, but not worsened either.>

References

External links 
 
 

Orphan drugs
Dwarfism